Ophelia Deroy is professor of Philosophy of Mind at Ludwig Maximilian University of Munich and a member of the Graduate School in Systemic Neuroscience (GSN) in Munich. She is the former deputy director of the Institute of Philosophy at the University of London. She received the Prix de la Chancellerie des Universites de Paris in 2007.

Selected publications

Books
 Sensory Blending: On Synaesthesia and Related Phenomena. Oxford University Press, 2017. (Co-editor)

Articles
 Fairhurst, M. T., & Deroy, O. (2017). Testing the shared spatial representation of magnitude of auditory and visual intensity. Journal of Experimental Psychology: Human Perception and Performance, 43(3), 629–638.
 Deroy, O., Spence, C., & Noppeney, U. (2016). Metacognition in multisensory perception, Trends in Cognitive Sciences, 20, 736–747.
 Deroy, O., Faivre, N., Lunghi, C., Spence, C., Aller, M., & Noppeney, U. (2016). The complex interplay between multisensory integration and perceptual awareness, Multisensory Research, 29, 585 – 606.
 Deroy, O., Fasiello, I., Hayward, V., & Auvray, M. (2016). Differentiated audio-tactile correspondences in sighted and blind individuals, Journal of Experimental Psychology, Human Perception and Performance, 42, 1204–1214.
 Deroy, O., Chen, Y.-C., & Spence, C. (2014). Multisensory constraints on awareness. Philosophical Transactions of The Royal Society B., 369, 1641, 20130207
 Deroy, O. (2013). Object-sensitivity versus cognitive penetrability of perception. Philosophical Studies, 162, 87-107.
 Deroy, O. & Spence, C. (2013a). Are we all born synaesthetic? Examining the neonatal synaesthesia hypothesis. Neuroscience & Biobehavioral Reviews, 37, 1240–1253.
 Deroy, O., & Spence, C. (2013b). Why we are not all synesthetes (not even weakly so). Psychonomic Bulletin & Review, 20, 1-22.
 Spence, C., & Deroy, O. (2013) How automatic are crossmodal correspondences? Consciousness and Cognition, 22, 245–260.
 Deroy, O., & Auvray, M. (2012). Reading the world through the skin and ears: a new perspective on sensory substitution. Frontiers in Psychology, 3:457.
 Spence, C., & Deroy, O. (2012). Hearing mouth shapes: Sound symbolism and the reverse McGurk effect. I-Perception, 3, 550–552.

Chapters
 Deroy, O., Fernandez-Prieto, I. ,Navarra, J. & Spence, C. (2017). Unravelling the paradox of spatial pitch, in Hubbard, T (ed.) Spatial biases in perception and cognition, Cambridge : MIT Press.
 Deroy, O. (2016). Multisensory perception and cognitive penetration. In D. Raftopoulos & J. Zembekis (eds). Cognitive Penetration, Oxford: Oxford University Press.
 Deroy, O. (2015) Can Sounds be Red? A New Account of Synaesthesia as Enriched Experience, in Coleman, S. & Coates, P. (eds) Phenomenal Qualities, Oxford: Oxford University Press.
 Deroy, O. (2014). The unity assumption and the many unities of consciousness. In C. Hill & D. Bennett (eds.) The Unity of Consciousness and Sensory Integration. Cambridge (Mass.): MIT Press.
 Deroy, O. (2014). Modularity. In M. Matthen (ed) Oxford Handbook of Philosophy of Perception, Oxford: Oxford University Press.
 Auvray, M. & Deroy, O. (2014). Synesthesia. In M. Matthen (ed.) Oxford Handbook of Philosophy of Perception, Oxford: Oxford University Press.
 Deroy, O. & Auvray, M. (2014). A crossmodal perspective on sensory substitution. In M. Matthen, S. Biggs & D. Stokes (eds.) Perception and its Modalities, Oxford: Oxford University Press.
 Spence, C. & Deroy, O. (2013). Crossmodal imagery. In S. Lacey and R. Lawson (eds.) Multisensory Imagery (pp. 157–183), New York: Springer.

References

External links 
Ophelia DEROY | School of Advanced Study, University of London - Academia.edu
Dr Ophelia Deroy | School of Advanced Study

Living people
Year of birth missing (living people)
French philosophers
Academic staff of the Ludwig Maximilian University of Munich
French women philosophers
Academics of the University of London
École Normale Supérieure alumni